Nakhon Nayok Football Club (Thai สโมสรฟุตบอลจังหวัดนครนายก ) is a Thai professional football club based in Nakhon Nayok province. They currently play in Thai League T4 Eastern Region.

Stadium and locations

Seasons

Current Squads

Honours

Domestic leagues
Regional League Central-East Division
 Runner-up (1) : 2013

External links 
 Official Website of Nakhon Nayok FC
 Fanclub of Nakhon Nayok FC
 Official Facebookpage of Nakhon Nayok FC

Association football clubs established in 2009
Football clubs in Thailand
Sport in Nakhon Nayok province
2009 establishments in Thailand